Restless in the Tides is the first full-length album by heavy metal music group Forever in Terror.

Track listing

Personnel
Forever in Terror
Chris Bianchi - Vocals
Johnny Burke - Lead Guitar
Nate "Nate Dogg" Marti - Rhythm Guitar
Josh "Jmurda" Owen - Bass
Nick " NickB" Borukhovsky - Drums
Guest
Mark Hunter of Chimaira - Vocals on "In the Face of the Faceless"
Production
Johnny Burke - Producer
Don Debiase - Producer

References 

Restless in the Tides
Metal Blade Records albums
Forever in Terror albums